Sir Reginald Stuart Champion,  (21 March 1895 – 9 October 1982) was a British colonial administrator and Church of England clergyman. He was Governor of Aden from 1944 to 1951.

Life and career 
The son of Philip Champion and Florence Mary Hulburd, Champion was educated at Sutton Valence School. In 1912 he enlisted in the West Kent Yeomanry, and in 1913 was commissioned in the East Surrey Regiment. During the First World War, he served in the Middle East; in 1917 he was assigned to the Occupied Enemy Territory Administration in Palestine. He transferred to the Colonial Administrative Service in 1920, and served as District Officer in Palestine until 1928.

Champion was Political Secretary in Aden from 1928 to 1934, Financial Adviser to the Emirate of Trans-Jordan from 1934 to 1939, and District Commissioner in the Galilee from 1939 to 1942. He also carried out political missions to the Yemen in 1933–34 and 1940. He was appointed Chief Secretary to the Government of Aden in 1942, and was appointed Governor and Commander-in-Chief of Aden in 1944. He retired from the Colonial Service in 1951.

After his retirement from government service, Champion entered the Lincoln Theological College in 1952, being ordained a deacon in January and a priest in December. The same year, he was appointed a curate at All Saints’, Maidstone. In 1953 he was appointed Vicar of Chilham, Kent. He retired from active ministry in 1961. In retirement he lived in Tunbridge Wells.

Champion was appointed OBE in 1934, a CMG in 1944, and a KCMG in 1946.

Family 
Champion married Margaret Macgregor, daughter of Very Rev. W. M. Macgregor, in 1920. They had two sons and a daughter.

References

External links 

 

1895 births
1982 deaths
Colonial Administrative Service officers
Governors of Aden
East Surrey Regiment officers
Queen's Own West Kent Yeomanry soldiers
People educated at Sutton Valence School
Officers of the Order of the British Empire
Knights Commander of the Order of St Michael and St George
20th-century English Anglican priests
British Army personnel of World War I
Church of England priests